The 1976 Macdonald Lassies Championship, the Canadian women's curling championship was held February 28 to March 5, 1976, at Winnipeg Arena in Winnipeg, Manitoba. Despite a transit strike, attendance for the event exceeded 17,000.

Alberta and British Columbia both finished round robin play tied for first with 7–2 records, necessitating a tiebreaker playoff between the two teams. Team British Columbia, who was skipped by Lindsay Davie defeated Alberta 7–6 in the tiebreaker to capture the championship. This was BC's third title overall and their first since . This would also be the first of three titles for Davie (later Sparkes) with the first two coming as a skip.

Teams
The teams are listed as follows:

Standings
Final round robin standings

Tiebreaker

References

External links
Coverage on CurlingZone

Scotties Tournament of Hearts
Macdonald Lassies
Curling competitions in Winnipeg
1976 in Manitoba
February 1976 sports events in Canada
March 1976 sports events in Canada
1976 in women's curling